Thomas Joseph Cullinan Fitzmaurice (7 July 1898 – 25 December 1977) was an Australian rules footballer in the (then) Victorian Football League (VFL).

Football 
A brilliant centre-half-back, he commenced his career with Essendon Football Club 1918. Transferred to Sydney in 1921 with his employment, Fitzmaurice played that season in the local competition and captained New South Wales against Victoria and Tasmania. He rejoined Essendon in 1922 and later formed part of their very successful 1923 and 1924 premiership teams. In the famous Essendon "mosquito fleet" (so called because of the half-dozen players 168 cm or under), Fitzmaurice was the tallest member of the side at 189 cm.

Fitzmaurice left Essendon after the controversy at the end of the 1924 season when he felt that several Essendon players had deliberately lost a match against Victorian Football Association premiers .

He played in a premiership team at Geelong Football Club in his first year. Leaving Geelong after 1928, he played with Mortlake and then the VFA side, Yarraville. He returned to the VFL in 1932, playing with North Melbourne.  Moving to the forward lines he became their leading goalkicker for three seasons.

He took over the coaching position at North after Dick Taylor resigned in disgust in mid-1934. He had eight games to turn the club around, but they didn't win any games. Re-appointed for 1935, Fitzmaurice resigned a broken man after a winless 8 rounds. The last straw was an insipid effort against eventual premiers .

After twelve months he decided to play again, this time in Penguin, Tasmania.

Hall of Fame 
In 1996, Fitzmaurice was inducted into the Australian Football Hall of Fame.

Champions of Essendon 
In 1997, Fitzmaurice was included in Essendon's inaugural Team of the Century.

In 2002, an Essendon panel ranked him at 10 in their Champions of Essendon list of the 25 greatest players ever to have played for Essendon.

Footnotes

References

External links
 
 AFL Hall of Fame

1898 births
1977 deaths
Australian rules footballers from Melbourne
Australian Rules footballers: place kick exponents
Players of Australian handball
Essendon Football Club players
Essendon Football Club Premiership players
Champions of Essendon
Geelong Football Club players
Geelong Football Club Premiership players
Yarraville Football Club players
North Melbourne Football Club players
North Melbourne Football Club coaches
Geelong Football Club coaches
Mortlake Football Club players
Penguin Football Club players
Australian Football Hall of Fame inductees
Crichton Medal winners

Three-time VFL/AFL Premiership players
People from Fitzroy, Victoria